The Court Square–Dexter Avenue Historic District is a  historic district in downtown Montgomery, Alabama, United States. Centered on the Court Square Fountain, the district includes twenty-seven contributing buildings and two objects. It is roughly bounded by Dexter Avenue, Perry, Court and Monroe streets.  Architectural styles in the district include Italianate, Late Victorian, and various Revival styles. It was placed on the National Register of Historic Places on March 1, 1982. The boundaries were subsequently increased on August 30, 1984.

References

National Register of Historic Places in Montgomery, Alabama
Historic districts in Montgomery, Alabama
Victorian architecture in Alabama
Italianate architecture in Alabama
Historic districts on the National Register of Historic Places in Alabama